European route E 848 is a European B class road in Italy, connecting the cities Lamezia Terme – Catanzaro.

Route 
 
 Lamezia Terme
 E90 Catanzaro

External links 
 UN Economic Commission for Europe: Overall Map of E-road Network (2007)
 International E-road network

International E-road network
Roads in Italy